Dynamical decoupling (DD) is an open-loop quantum control technique employed in quantum computing to suppress decoherence by taking advantage of rapid, time-dependent control modulation.  In its simplest form, DD is implemented by periodic sequences of instantaneous control pulses, whose net effect is to approximately average the unwanted system-environment coupling to zero. Different schemes exist for designing DD protocols that use realistic bounded-strength control pulses, as well as for achieving high-order error suppression, and for making DD compatible with quantum gates. In spin systems in particular, commonly used protocols for dynamical decoupling include the Carr-Purcell and the Carr-Purcell-Meiboom-Gill schemes. They are based on the Hahn spin echo technique of applying periodic pulses to enable refocusing and hence extend the coherence times of qubits.

Periodic repetition of suitable high-order DD sequences may be employed to engineer a ‘stroboscopic saturation’ of qubit coherence, or coherence plateau, that can persist in the presence of realistic noise spectra and experimental control imperfections. This permits device-independent, high-fidelity data storage for computationally useful periods with bounded error probability.

Dynamical decoupling has also been studied in a classical context for two coupled pendulums whose oscillation frequencies are modulated in time.

References

Quantum information science